Larisa Zakharova (born 31 October 1950) is a Russian former medley swimmer. She competed in three events at the 1968 Summer Olympics for the Soviet Union.

References

External links
 

1950 births
Living people
Russian female medley swimmers
Olympic swimmers of the Soviet Union
Swimmers at the 1968 Summer Olympics
Sportspeople from Perm, Russia
Soviet female medley swimmers